Vincat was a Canadian three-piece psychedelic pop band from Victoria, British Columbia.

Discography

Albums
"Hoi Polloi" -independent release 2009

"I like their older stuff better" -independent release 2005

EPs
"Earthly Rotations" -independent release 2009

Inner Space  -independent release 2007

Singles 
"The Brightest" (Single) - Do The Mint Twist Mint Records - 2007

"Werewolves" (Single) - The Aaargh Annual  Aaargh Records - 2007

See also 
 List of bands from Canada

References

External links 
 Vincat at MySpace

 Vincat interview in the Coast
 Vincat interview in Metropolitan
 Vincat single on Mint Records
 Vincat Last.fm profile

Canadian indie pop groups
Musical groups established in 2004
Musical groups disestablished in 2009
Musical groups from Victoria, British Columbia
2004 establishments in British Columbia
2009 disestablishments in British Columbia